Bee Branch is a stream in northeast Adair and southwest Scotland counties of the U.S. state of Missouri. It is a tributary of Bridge Creek.

Bee Branch was so named on account of honeybees in the area.

See also
List of rivers of Missouri

References

Rivers of Adair County, Missouri
Rivers of Scotland County, Missouri
Rivers of Missouri